Per Winge (20 January 1914 – 20 March 1989) was a Danish sports shooter. He competed in the 25 m pistol event at the 1952 Summer Olympics.

References

1914 births
1989 deaths
Danish male sport shooters
Olympic shooters of Denmark
Shooters at the 1952 Summer Olympics
Sportspeople from Copenhagen
People from Hundested